The Brigantii (Gaulish: Brigantioi, 'the eminent, high ones') were a Gallic tribe dwelling southeast of Lake Constance, near present-day Bregenz (Vorarlberg), during the Roman era.

Name 
They are mentioned as Brigántioi (Βριγάντιοι) by Strabo (early 1st c. AD). An identification with the Brixentes, a tribe listed on the Tropaeum Alpium, has been proposed.

The ethnic name Brigantii is a latinized form of Gaulish Brigantioi. It derives from the stem briganti-, meaning 'high, elevated', and can be compared with the name of the goddess Brigantia and the various toponyms Brigantio(n) ('eminence'), at the origin of modern Briançon, Brégançon, Briantes, and Bregenz.

Geography 
The Brigantii lived southeast of Lake Constance (Lacus Brigantinus), in Raetia. Their territory was located north of the Vennones, west of the Estiones, east of the Lentienses.

Their chief town was known as Brigantium ('high place'; modern Bregenz). The settlement was located on the northeastern bay of Lake Constance, at an intersection of important east-west and north-south traffic routes. Late La Tène finds from the Ölrain plateau suggest the existence of a pre-Roman oppidum in the upper part of town.

References

Primary sources

Bibliography 

Historical Celtic peoples
Gauls